Aberdeen Shikoyi (1985 – 28 April 2012) was a Kenyan rugby union player. She was the captain of the women's rugby union team. 

In 2012, Shikoyi sustained a spinal injury during a rugby match and died a few days later.

References

External links
Mwamba RFC Profile

1985 births
2012 deaths
Kenyan rugby union players
Female rugby union players
Sport deaths in Kenya